John Daniel Taylor (27 January 1872 – 21 February 1949) was a Scottish professional footballer.

Career
Born in Dumbarton in 1872, Taylor started off his career at local club Dumbarton He signed for St Mirren in 1894. In 1896 Taylor was signed by English club Everton where he played in a number of positions. He was the only Everton player to feature in the FA Cup Finals of 1897, 1906 and 1907, finishing on the winning side in 1906.

In the 1910 FA Cup semi-final against Barnsley Taylor was struck by the ball in the throat, damaging his larynx. This effectively ended his professional career and he was transferred to amateurs South Liverpool. Taylor is currently one of only 6 players to make 400 Football League appearances for Everton, making 456 in all competitions, 7th in the club's all-time appearance chart.

Honours
Dumbarton
 Scottish League: Champions 1890-1891;1891-1892
 Scottish Cup: Runners Up 1890-1891
 Dumbartonshire Cup: Winners 1890-1891;1891-1892;1892-1893
 League Charity Cup: Winners 1890–91
 3 caps for Scotland between 1891 and 1893, scoring one goal;
 4 caps for the Scottish League between 1891 and 1894, scoring two goals
 1 international trial for Scotland in 1892
 1 representative cap for Dumbartonshire in 1892, scoring one goal.

References

External links
Everton Legends at www.evertonfc.com

1872 births
1949 deaths
Sportspeople from Dumbarton
Footballers from West Dunbartonshire
Scottish footballers
Everton F.C. players
Dumbarton F.C. players
St Mirren F.C. players
South Liverpool F.C. players
Scotland international footballers
Scottish Football League players
Scottish Football League representative players
English Football League players
Place of death missing
Association football utility players
FA Cup Final players